is a Japanese company that most notably manufactured medium- and large-format cameras. The company's first camera, the PC-101, was offered in 1948 as a police inspection camera; this was soon developed into a press camera, the Horseman 102, which was the first Horseman Professional branded camera.

History
In 1933, Komamura Brothers was founded in Kyoto; the first camera produced was the PC-101, an inspection camera for the National Police Agency produced in 1948. This was developed into the Horseman 102, which was also designed for police inspection and offered in 1950.

Komamura relocated in Tokyo in 1982. In 1992, Komamura signed the first of several licensing agreements to be the exclusive distributor for foreign photographic and video products in Japan, including Rodenstock and Schneider Kreuznach lenses, Gossen light meters, and Anton Bauer batteries.

Komamura transferred the Horseman Professional photographic business assets to Kenko Professional Imaging in 2012; Kenko continues to market the cameras and photographic accessories developed by Komamura under the Horseman brand. Komamura's primary business is currently centered on sales of night vision scopes and cameras.

Products

Current
Komamura developed and launched the Falcon Eye KC-2000 high-sensitivity camera in 2014, providing full-color imaging.

Past
Past cameras developed by Komamura and marketed under the Horseman Professional brand include:

35mm
 DigiFlex / DigiFlex II
 Horseman 3D

Medium format

Press/Field
Horseman 970
Horseman 975
Horseman 980
Horseman 985
Horseman VH (VH-R)
 Limited movements (vertical/lateral shift only)
 Horseman SW-D Pro
 Horseman SW612 Professional
 Horseman SW617 Professional
 Horseman SW6x9
Rigid camera (no movements)
Horseman SW612

Large format

Press/Field
Horseman 45FA
Horseman 45HD
Woodman 45
View
Horseman L-series (L, LS, LE, LX)
 Horseman X-Act-D

Accessories marketed by Horseman include:

35mm
 VCC (View Camera Converter)
 LD / LD Pro (L-series View Camera for Digital SLRs)

Medium format
 VCC (View Camera Converter)

Large format
 ISS (Intelligent Shutter System)

References

External links
 
 
 

Photography companies of Japan
Japanese brands
Manufacturing companies based in Tokyo
Manufacturing companies established in 1933
Japanese companies established in 1933